Kyle Douglas Dake (born February 25, 1991) is an American freestyle wrestler and graduated folkstyle wrestler who currently competes at 74 kilograms. Dake is a four-time and the reigning World Champion, winning back-to-back titles twice, at 79 kilos in 2018 and 2019 and 74 kilos in 2021 and 2022. He claimed a bronze medal at the 2020 Summer Olympics (competing for the first time at 74 kilos) held in Tokyo. During his first World Championship tournament, Dake outscored his opposition 37 points to zero, not surrendering a single point.

In college, he became the third four-time NCAA Division I National Champion in history, and the only one to ever do so in four different weight classes, and without a redshirt season. He was named the Dan Hodge Trophy winner as a senior and he also claimed three EIWA titles, competing out of Cornell University.

Folkstyle 
Dake competed for the wrestling team at Cornell University. Between 2010 and 2013, he became only the third wrestler to win four NCAA Division I Wrestling titles. Among four-time champions, Dake is the first wrestler to win each title in four different weight classes, and the only one to not redshirt a season during his college career.

Following his senior season, WIN magazine awarded Dake the Dan Hodge Trophy as the most outstanding college wrestler.

Freestyle career

Age-group 
In the age-group, Dake focused more in the Greco-Roman discipline, but in freestyle, he was a two–time FILA US National All-American and a Fargo All-American. In Greco-Roman, he was a three-time FILA US National finalist, winning the championship in 2008, as well as the US World Team Trials. He placed fourteenth at the '08 Greco-Roman Junior World Championships.

Senior level

2011–2014 

Dake made his senior freestyle debut in April 2011, at the age of 20, when he became the US university national runner-up to 2010 US national champion Andrew Howe. In June, he competed at the US World Team Trials, where he posted wins over J.P O'Connor and Tyler Caldwell, going 3–2 overall.

In April 2012, Dake, then a three–time NCAA champion, attempted to become the US Olympic team member at 74 kilos, but was unable to as he was defeated by Trent Paulson in the semifinals. Overall, he had wins overDavid Taylor (pin), and Nick Marable (twice) to place third.

After graduation, Dake competed at the 2013 US World Team Trials in an attempt of representing the US at the 2013 World Championships, but after defeating Trent Paulson, David Taylor, and Andrew Howe, he was unable to win the best-of-three finale, falling to the defending Olympic and World Champion Jordan Burroughs, who would go on to again claim the World Championship. Competing at the Heydar Aliyev Golden Grand Prix in Azerbaijan, Dake severely injured his hand, but still topped two-time World Champion from Russia Denis Tsargush, before losing twice to place fifth. Due to his injury, Dake was unable to continue competing for the rest of 2013, and only came back in February 2014 at his championship performance from the Granma Cup, but after more injuries and infections, he sat out until November 2014, where he won a single match.

2015–2017 
During 2015, he competed at the US World Team Trials after winning the Northeastern Regionals, and was able to advance to the best–of–three finals. Dake was once again defeated twice in a row by Jordan Burroughs, who would go on to claim his third World Championship. Dake then did not compete until December, when he moved up to 86 kilograms for the US Nationals, placing first after beating David Taylor, Jon Reader, Keith Gavin and Tyrel Todd. In 2016, his appearances were also scarce, as he only competed at the Alexander Medved Open, placing ninth, and at the US Olympic Team Trials. At the trials, Dake defeated Richard Perry and David Taylor to advance to the best-of-three finals. Facing J'den Cox, Dake was defeated in the first match, and after coming back to win the second match, he was defeated again in the third match, placing second at the US Olympic Team Trials.

In 2017, Dake moved back down to 74 kilograms, and claimed the Grand Prix of Paris in January after defeating Alex Dieringer in the finals. At the US Open in April, Dake once again defeated Dieringer in the semifinals, but lost to Jordan Burroughs on criteria and placed second. At the US World Team Trials, Dake defeated two-time NCAA champion Isaiah Martinez and three-time NCAA champion Alex Dieringer to make the best-of-three finals. Facing Jordan Burroughs, Dake took the first match on criteria, but lost twice in a row by decision, seemingly having ended the rivalry 1–7 in favor of Burroughs. He competed one more time in December, when he moved up to 79 kilograms and helped Team USA reach second place at the Clubs World Cup with six technical falls.

2018 
In his first event of the year, Dake competed at the Golden Grand Prix Ivan Yarygin. After defeating Alan Zaseev and Rashid Kurbanov, he was defeated by Akhmed Gadzhimagomedov, claiming the silver medal. However, he came back to the top of the podium at the World Cup, where he was able to beat Sosuke Takatani and Tariel Gaprindashvili, before defeating Jabrayil Hasanov en route to a team title. Later in the month, Dake claimed his second US national title, defeating Alex Dieringer in the finale. After defeating Liván López at Beat the Streets, Dake made his first US World Team at Final X: State College, when he defeated Zahid Valencia twice in a row. To warm up, Dake claimed the Yasar Dogu International when he defeated Jabrayil Hasanov, Ayhan Sucu, and Ibrahim Yusubov.

In October, Dake competed at the World Championships for the first time in his career, at age 27. He won every match via technical fall without giving up a point up until the finals, defeating Martin Obst, Davit Khutsishvili and avenging his only loss at the weight class to Akhmed Gadzhimagomedov. In the finale, Dake once again defeated Jabrayil Hasanov, on points, to comfortably claim his first World Championship.

2019–2020 
The newly crowned World Champion, Dake was unable to defend his US World Team spot in June at Final X: Rutgers against Alex Dieringer, due to a "freak accident" which required surgery, pushing the wrestle–offs for later on. Instead, he came back on July at the Grand Prix of Spain, where after five matches, Dake was victorious and stood on top of the podium. The wrestle–offs for the US World Team spot with Alex Dieringer took place in August, with Dake defeating Dieringer twice to defend the spot. A month later, Dake competed at his second World Championships. After defeating Gadzhi Nabiev and Rashid Kurbanov, he once again defeated Jabrayil Hasanov from Azerbaijan to become a two–time World Champion.

Dake moved back down to 74 kilograms to attempt to compete at the 2020 Summer Olympics. In his first tournament of the year, Dake claimed the Matteo Pellicone Ranking Series championship, defeating Soner Demirtaş in the finale to emerge in the rankings at 74 kg. He was then scheduled to compete at the US Olympic Team Trials in April 4–5, however, the event was postponed along with the Summer Olympics due to the COVID-19 outbreak. Due to the pandemic, Dake was only able to compete one more time in the year, defeating two-time World Champion (65kg and 70kg) from Italy Frank Chamizo while headlining FloWrestling: Dake vs. Chamizo in July.

2021 
To start off the Olympic year, Dake defeated David McFadden at the SCRTC I in January 8. A week later, he won gold at the Grand Prix de France Henri Deglane. He then defeated Vincenzo Joseph and Jason Nolf. In April, Dake competed at the rescheduled US Olympic Team Trials in April 2–3, without a seed as he would go on to get a berth to the semifinals as a World Champion at a non–Olympic weight. In the challenge bracket, Dake defeated Evan Wick and Jason Nolf to head to the best of three final. Facing former rival and five–time Olympic and World Champion Jordan Burroughs, Dake was able to defeat Burroughs, thus putting an end to his nine year–long reign. After one of the biggest wins of his career, Dake earned the right to represent the United States at the 2020 Summer Olympics. As a result, Dake also competed at the Pan American Continental Championships on May 30. He claimed the crown after racking up 40 points against four opponents and going unscored, helping the USA reach all the 10 freestyle medals.

On August 5, Dake competed at the first date of the men's freestyle 74 kg event of the 2020 Summer Olympics as one of the favorites to claim the gold medal, even though his signature weight was 79 kg. After a 4–0 victory over Mostafa Hosseinkhani from Iran, Dake was defeated by Magomedkhabib Kadimagomedov from Belarus, losing by technical fall for the first time since 2015 and not being able to score a point on an opponent since 2013, as well as snapping a former 49-match win streak. After the stunning loss, Dake battled and rallied for the bronze medal defeating Geandry Garzón from Cuba and Frank Chamizo.

As an Olympic medalist, Dake earned the right to automatically represent the United States at the 2021 World Championships without having to compete domestically to make the US World Team, and did so from October 2 to 3. After a quick first day to make the finals, Dake got his redemption after defeating Tajmuraz Salkazanov to claim his third straight World Championship, and his first at 74 kilograms.

2022 
In his first competition of the year, Dake defended his Pan American Championship on May 8, beating Franklin Gómez.

On September 17, at the World Championships in Belgrade, Dake won his second straight world championship at 74kg, and fourth overall. In the finals, Dake defeated Tajmuraz Salkazanov of Slovakia 3-2.

Freestyle record 

! colspan="7"| Senior Freestyle Matches
|-
!  Res.
!  Record
!  Opponent
!  Score
!  Date
!  Event
!  Location
|-
! style=background:white colspan=7 |
|-
|Win
|120–18
|align=left| Tajmuraz Salkazanov
|style="font-size:88%"|3–2
|style="font-size:88%" rowspan=5|September 16-17, 2022
|style="font-size:88%" rowspan=5|2022 World Championships
|style="text-align:left;font-size:88%;" rowspan=5| Belgrade, Serbia
|-
|Win
|119–18
|align=left| Younes Emami
|style="font-size:88%"|2-2
|-
|Win
|118–18
|align=left| Sagar Jaglan
|style="font-size:88%"|Fall
|-
|Win
|117–18
|align=left| Suldkhuu Olonbayar
|style="font-size:88%"|TF 12-2
|-
|Win
|116–18
|align=left| Islambek Orozbekov
|style="font-size:88%"|TF 10-0
|-
! style=background:white colspan=7 |
|-
|Win
|115–18
|align=left| Jason Nolf
|style="font-size:88%"|2-1
|style="font-size:88%" rowspan=2|June 8, 2022
|style="font-size:88%" rowspan=2|2022 Final X NYC
|style="text-align:left;font-size:88%;" rowspan=2| New York City, New York
|-
|Win
|114–18
|align=left| Jason Nolf
|style="font-size:88%"|4–2
|-
! style=background:white colspan=7 |
|-
|Win
|113–18
|align=left| Franklin Gomez
|style="font-size:88%"|10–1
|style="font-size:88%" rowspan=3|May 8, 2022
|style="font-size:88%" rowspan=3|2022 Pan American Continental Championships
|style="text-align:left;font-size:88%;" rowspan=3| Acapulco, Mexico
|-
|Win
|112–18
|align=left| Frank Maren
|style="font-size:88%"|TF 10–0
|-
|Win
|111–18
|align=left| Diego Santival
|style="font-size:88%"|TF 12–1
|-
! style=background:white colspan=7 |
|-
|Win
|110–18
|align=left| Tajmuraz Salkazanov
|style="font-size:88%"|7–3
|style="font-size:88%"|October 3, 2021
|style="font-size:88%" rowspan=4|2021 World Championships
|style="text-align:left;font-size:88%;" rowspan=4| Oslo, Norway
|-
|Win
|109–18
|align=left| Azamat Nurykau
|style="font-size:88%"|9–1
|style="font-size:88%" rowspan=3|October 2, 2021
|-
|Win
|108–18
|align=left| Fazlı Eryılmaz
|style="font-size:88%"|5–0
|-
|Win
|107–18
|align=left| Vasile Diacon
|style="font-size:88%"|TF 11–0
|-
! style=background:white colspan=7 |
|-
|Win
|106–18
|align=left| Frank Chamizo
|style="font-size:88%"|5–0
|style="font-size:88%" rowspan=2|August 6, 2021
|style="font-size:88%" rowspan=4|2020 Summer Olympics
|style="text-align:left;font-size:88%;" rowspan=4| Tokyo, Japan
|-
|Win
|105–18
|align=left| Geandry Garzón
|style="font-size:88%"|TF 10–0
|-
|Loss
|104–18
|align=left| Magomedkhabib Kadimagomedov
|style="font-size:88%"|TF 0–11
|style="font-size:88%" rowspan=2|August 5, 2021
|-
|Win
|104–17
|align=left| Mostafa Hosseinkhani
|style="font-size:88%"|4–0
|-
! style=background:white colspan=7 |
|-
|Win
|103–17
|align=left| Víctor Eduardo Hernández
|style="font-size:88%"|TF 10–0
|style="font-size:88%" rowspan=4|May 30, 2021
|style="font-size:88%" rowspan=4|2021 Pan American Continental Championships
|style="text-align:left;font-size:88%;" rowspan=4| Guatemala City, Guatemala
|-
|Win
|102–17
|align=left| Jasmit Singh Phulka
|style="font-size:88%"|TF 10–0
|-
|Win
|101–17
|align=left| Renato Patricio Da Silva
|style="font-size:88%"|TF 10–0
|-
|Win
|100–17
|align=left| Julio Rodríguez
|style="font-size:88%"|TF 10–0
|-
! style=background:white colspan=7 | 
|-
|Win
|99–17
|align=left| Jordan Burroughs
|style="font-size:88%"|3–2
|style="font-size:88%" rowspan=2|April 3, 2021
|style="font-size:88%" rowspan=4|2020 US Olympic Team Trials
|style="text-align:left;font-size:88%;" rowspan=4|
 Fort Worth, Texas
|-
|Win
|98–17
|align=left| Jordan Burroughs
|style="font-size:88%"|3–0
|-
|Win
|97–17
|align=left| Jason Nolf
|style="font-size:88%"|TF 11–0
|style="font-size:88%" rowspan=2|April 2, 2021
|-
|Win
|96–17
|align=left| Evan Wick
|style="font-size:88%"|TF 10–0
|-
|Win
|95–17
|align=left| Jason Nolf
|style="font-size:88%"|5–0
|style="font-size:88%" rowspan=2|February 23, 2021
|style="font-size:88%" rowspan=2|NLWC V
|style="text-align:left;font-size:88%;" rowspan=2|
 State College, Pennsylvania
|-
|Win
|94–17
|align=left| Vincenzo Joseph
|style="font-size:88%"|TF 10–0
|-
! style=background:white colspan=7 | 
|-
|Win
|93–17
|align=left| Khadzhimurad Gadzhiyev
|style="font-size:88%"|Fall
|style="font-size:88%" rowspan=3|January 16, 2021
|style="font-size:88%" rowspan=3|Grand Prix de France Henri Deglane 2021 
|style="text-align:left;font-size:88%;" rowspan=3|
 Nice, France
|-
|Win
|92–17
|align=left| Mitch Finesilver
|style="font-size:88%"|TF 11–0
|-
|Win
|91–17
|align=left| Jonathan Alvarez
|style="font-size:88%"|TF 11–0
|-
|Win
|90–17
|align=left| David McFadden
|style="font-size:88%"|TF 11–0
|style="font-size:88%"|January 8, 2021
|style="font-size:88%"|SCRTC I
|style="text-align:left;font-size:88%;" rowspan=2|
 Austin, Texas
|-
|Win
|89–17
|align=left| Frank Chamizo
|style="font-size:88%"|4–3
|style="font-size:88%"|July 25, 2020 
|style="font-size:88%"|FloWrestling: Dake vs. Chamizo
|-
! style=background:white colspan=7 |
|-
|Win
|88–17
|align=left| Soner Demirtaş
|style="font-size:88%"|TF 11–0
|style="font-size:88%" rowspan=4|January 15–18, 2020 
|style="font-size:88%" rowspan=4|Matteo Pellicone Ranking Series 2020
|style="text-align:left;font-size:88%;" rowspan=4|
 Rome, Italy
|-
|Win
|87–17
|align=left| Fazli Eryilmaz
|style="font-size:88%"|3–1
|-
|Win
|86–17
|align=left| Murad Kuramagomedov
|style="font-size:88%"|TF 10–0
|-
|Win
|85–17
|align=left| Azamat Nurykau
|style="font-size:88%"|5–1
|-
! style=background:white colspan=7 | 
|-
|Win
|84–17
|align=left| Jabrayil Hasanov
|style="font-size:88%"|4–2
|style="font-size:88%" rowspan=4|September 14–22, 2019
|style="font-size:88%" rowspan=4|2019 World Championships
|style="text-align:left;font-size:88%;" rowspan=4|
 Nur-Sultan, Kazakhstan
|-
|Win
|83–17
|align=left| Rashid Kurbanov
|style="font-size:88%"|6–1
|-
|Win
|82–17
|align=left| Gadzhi Nabiev
|style="font-size:88%"|5–1
|-
|Win
|81–17
|align=left| Oibek Nasirov
|style="font-size:88%"|TF 12–2
|-
! style=background:white colspan=7 |
|-
|Win
|80–17
|align=left| Alex Dieringer
|style="font-size:88%"|4–2
|style="font-size:88%" rowspan=2|August 17, 2019
|style="font-size:88%" rowspan=2|2019 Final X Special Wrestle-off: Dake vs. Dieringer
|style="text-align:left;font-size:88%;" rowspan=2|
 Austin, Texas
|-
|Win
|79–17
|align=left| Alex Dieringer
|style="font-size:88%"|3–2
|-
! style=background:white colspan=7 | 
|-
|Win
|78–17
|align=left| Dauletmurat Orazgylyov
|style="font-size:88%"|5–0
|style="font-size:88%" rowspan=5|July 5–7, 2019
|style="font-size:88%" rowspan=5|2019 Grand Prix of Spain
|style="text-align:left;font-size:88%;" rowspan=5|
 Madrid, Spain
|-
|Win
|77–17
|align=left| Max Budgey
|style="font-size:88%"|TF 12–2
|-
|Win
|76–17
|align=left| Sarmat Tsarakhov
|style="font-size:88%"|TF 12–0
|-
|Win
|75–17
|align=left| Carlos Gilabert
|style="font-size:88%"|TF 10–0
|-
|Win
|74–17
|align=left| Dauletmurat Orazgylyov
|style="font-size:88%"|7–5
|-
! style=background:white colspan=7 | 
|-
|Win
|73–17
|align=left| Jabrayil Hasanov
|style="font-size:88%"|2–0
|style="font-size:88%" rowspan=4|October 20–28, 2018
|style="font-size:88%" rowspan=4|2018 World Championships
|style="text-align:left;font-size:88%;" rowspan=4|
 Budapest, Hungary
|-
|Win
|72–17
|align=left| Akhmed Gadzhimagomedov
|style="font-size:88%"|TF 13–0
|-
|Win
|71–17
|align=left| Davit Khutsishvili
|style="font-size:88%"|TF 11–0
|-
|Win
|70–17
|align=left| Martin Obst
|style="font-size:88%"|TF 11–0
|-
! style=background:white colspan=7 | 
|-
|Win
|69–17
|align=left| Ibrahim Yusubov
|style="font-size:88%"|TF 11–0
|style="font-size:88%" rowspan=3|July 27–29, 2018
|style="font-size:88%" rowspan=3|2018 Yasar Dogu Ranking Series
|style="text-align:left;font-size:88%;" rowspan=3|
 Istanbul, Turkey
|-
|Win
|68–17
|align=left| Ayhan Sucu
|style="font-size:88%"|Fall
|-
|Win
|67–17
|align=left| Jabrayil Hasanov
|style="font-size:88%"|Fall
|-
! style=background:white colspan=7 |
|-
|Win
|66–17
|align=left| Zahid Valencia
|style="font-size:88%"|4–3
|style="font-size:88%" rowspan=2|June 15–16, 2018
|style="font-size:88%" rowspan=2|2018 Final X: State College
|style="text-align:left;font-size:88%;" rowspan=2|
 State College, Pennsylvania
|-
|Win
|65–17
|align=left| Zahid Valencia
|style="font-size:88%"|4–0
|-
|Win
|64–17
|align=left| Liván López
|style="font-size:88%"|TF 13–1
|style="font-size:88%"|May 17, 2018
|style="font-size:88%"|2018 Beat The Streets: Team USA vs. The World All-Stars
|style="text-align:left;font-size:88%;" |
 New York City, New York
|-
! style=background:white colspan=7 | 
|-
|Win
|63–17
|align=left| Alex Dieringer
|style="font-size:88%"|5–5
|style="font-size:88%" rowspan=4|April 24–28, 2018
|style="font-size:88%" rowspan=4|2018 US Open National Championships
|style="text-align:left;font-size:88%;" rowspan=4|
 Las Vegas, Nevada
|-
|Win
|62–17
|align=left| Josh Asper
|style="font-size:88%"|TF 11–0
|-
|Win
|61–17
|align=left| Stacey Davis
|style="font-size:88%"|TF 10–0
|-
|Win
|60–17
|align=left| Ryan Christensen
|style="font-size:88%"|TF 10–0
|-
! style=background:white colspan=7 | 
|-
|Win
|59–17
|align=left| Jabrayil Hasanov
|style="font-size:88%"|5–3
|style="font-size:88%" rowspan=4|April 7–8, 2018
|style="font-size:88%" rowspan=4|2018 World Cup
|style="text-align:left;font-size:88%;" rowspan=4|
 Iowa City, Iowa
|-
|Win
|58–17
|align=left| Tariel Gaprindashvili
|style="font-size:88%"|TF 10–0
|-
|Win
|57–17
|align=left| Sosuke Takatani
|style="font-size:88%"|TF 10–0
|-
|Win
|56–17
|align=left| Sachin Giri
|style="font-size:88%"|TF 11–0
|-
! style=background:white colspan=7 | 
|-
|Loss
|55–17
|align=left| Akhmed Gadzhimagomedov
|style="font-size:88%"|1–8
|style="font-size:88%" rowspan=3|January 26–28, 2018
|style="font-size:88%" rowspan=3|2018 Ivan Yarygin Golden Grand Prix
|style="text-align:left;font-size:88%;" rowspan=3|
 Krasnoyarsk, Russia
|-
|Win
|55–16
|align=left| Rashid Kurbanov
|style="font-size:88%"|TF 10–0
|-
|Win
|54–16
|align=left| Alan Zaseev
|style="font-size:88%"|9–7
|-
! style=background:white colspan=7 | 
|-
|Win
|53–16
|align=left| Ahmed Shamiya
|style="font-size:88%"|TF 11–0
|style="font-size:88%" rowspan=5|December 7–8, 2017
|style="font-size:88%" rowspan=5|2017 World Wrestling Clubs Cup
|style="text-align:left;font-size:88%;" rowspan=5|
 Tehran, Iran
|-
|Win
|52–16
|align=left| Jitender
|style="font-size:88%"|TF 10–0
|-
|Win
|51–16
|align=left| Hasan Molla
|style="font-size:88%"|TF 10–0
|-
|Win
|50–16
|align=left| Ganbold Turbold
|style="font-size:88%"|TF 10–0
|-
|Win
|49–16
|align=left| Reza Afzali
|style="font-size:88%"|TF 12–0
|-
! style=background:white colspan=7 | 
|-
|Loss
|48–16
|align=left| Jordan Burroughs
|style="font-size:88%"|2–6
|style="font-size:88%" rowspan=5|June 9–10, 2017
|style="font-size:88%" rowspan=3|2017 US World Team Trials
|style="text-align:left;font-size:88%;" rowspan=5|
 Lincoln, Nebraska
|-
|Loss
|48–15
|align=left| Jordan Burroughs
|style="font-size:88%"|4–8
|-
|Win
|48–14
|align=left| Jordan Burroughs
|style="font-size:88%"|6–6
|-
|Win
|47–14
|align=left| Alex Dieringer
|style="font-size:88%"|2–1
|style="font-size:88%" rowspan=2|2017 US World Team Trials Challenge Tournament
|-
|Win
|46–14
|align=left| Isaiah Martinez
|style="font-size:88%"|9–2
|-
! style=background:white colspan=7 | 
|-
|Loss
|45–14
|align=left| Jordan Burroughs
|style="font-size:88%"|2–2
|style="font-size:88%" rowspan=4|April 26–29, 2017
|style="font-size:88%" rowspan=4|2017 US Open National Championships
|style="text-align:left;font-size:88%;" rowspan=4|
 Las Vegas, Nevada
|-
|Win
|45–13
|align=left| Alex Dieringer
|style="font-size:88%"|3–0
|-
|Win
|44–13
|align=left| Vladyslav Dombrovskiy
|style="font-size:88%"|TF 11–0
|-
|Win
|43–13
|align=left| Tyrel White
|style="font-size:88%"|TF 10–0
|-
! style=background:white colspan=7 | 
|-
|Win
|42–13
|align=left| Alex Dieringer
|style="font-size:88%"|TF 10–0
|style="font-size:88%" rowspan=4|January 28–29, 2017
|style="font-size:88%" rowspan=4|2017 International Paris Grand Prix
|style="text-align:left;font-size:88%;" rowspan=4|
 Paris, France
|-
|Win
|41–13
|align=left| Dan Valimont
|style="font-size:88%"|TF 11–0
|-
|Win
|40–13
|align=left| Davit Tlashadze
|style="font-size:88%"|TF 14–4
|-
|Win
|39–13
|align=left| Matt Brown
|style="font-size:88%"|TF 10–0
|-
! style=background:white colspan=7 | 
|-
|Loss
|38–13
|align=left| J'den Cox
|style="font-size:88%"|3–5
|style="font-size:88%" rowspan=5|April 9–10, 2016
|style="font-size:88%" rowspan=5|2016 US Olympic Team Trials
|style="text-align:left;font-size:88%;" rowspan=5|
 Iowa City, Iowa
|-
|Win
|38–12
|align=left| J'den Cox
|style="font-size:88%"|5–3
|-
|Loss
|37–12
|align=left| J'den Cox
|style="font-size:88%"|1–8
|-
|Win
|37–11
|align=left| David Taylor
|style="font-size:88%"|4–3
|-
|Win
|36–11
|align=left| Richard Perry
|style="font-size:88%"|10–7
|-
! style=background:white colspan=7 |
|-
|Loss
|35–11
|align=left| Amarhajy Mahamedau
|style="font-size:88%"|1–9
|style="font-size:88%" rowspan=3|February 18–19, 2016
|style="font-size:88%" rowspan=3|2016 Alexander Medved Prizes Ranking Series
|style="text-align:left;font-size:88%;" rowspan=3|
 Minsk, Belarus
|-
|Win
|35–10
|align=left| Irakli Mtsituri
|style="font-size:88%"|6–1
|-
|Win
|34–10
|align=left| Sebastian Jezierzanski
|style="font-size:88%"|TF 13–2
|-
! style=background:white colspan=7 |
|-
|Win
|33–10
|align=left| David Taylor
|style="font-size:88%"|11–4
|style="font-size:88%" rowspan=4|December 17–19, 2015
|style="font-size:88%" rowspan=4|2015 Senior Nationals - US Olympic Trials Qualifier
|style="text-align:left;font-size:88%;" rowspan=4|
 Las Vegas, Nevada
|-
|Win
|32–10
|align=left| Jon Reader
|style="font-size:88%"|6–4
|-
|Win
|31–10
|align=left| Keith Gavin
|style="font-size:88%"|6–2
|-
|Win
|30–10
|align=left| Tyrel Todd
|style="font-size:88%"|Fall
|-
! style=background:white colspan=7 | 
|-
|Loss
|29–10
|align=left| Jordan Burroughs
|style="font-size:88%"|TF 4–14
|style="font-size:88%" rowspan=5|June 12–14, 2015
|style="font-size:88%" rowspan=2|2015 US World Team Trials
|style="text-align:left;font-size:88%;" rowspan=5|
 Madison, Wisconsin
|-
|Loss
|29–9
|align=left| Jordan Burroughs
|style="font-size:88%"|3–6
|-
|Win
|29–8
|align=left| David Taylor
|style="font-size:88%"|8–2
|style="font-size:88%" rowspan=3|2015 US World Team Trials Challenge Tournament
|-
|Win
|28–8
|align=left| Andrew Howe
|style="font-size:88%"|3–1
|-
|Win
|27–8
|align=left| Colton Sponseller
|style="font-size:88%"|TF 10–0
|-
! style=background:white colspan=7 | 
|-
|Win
|26–8
|align=left| Mason Manville
|style="font-size:88%"|TF 11–0
|style="font-size:88%" rowspan=4|May 1–3, 2015
|style="font-size:88%" rowspan=4|2015 Phil Portuese Northeastern Regionals
|style="text-align:left;font-size:88%;" rowspan=4|
 East Stroudsburg, Pennsylvania
|-
|Win
|25–8
|align=left| Theodre King
|style="font-size:88%"|TF 10–0
|-
|Win
|24–8
|align=left| Nestor Taffur
|style="font-size:88%"|TF 12–2
|-
|Win
|23–8
|align=left| Nate Russell
|style="font-size:88%"|TF 10–0
|-
|Win
|22–8
|align=left| Andrew Howe
|style="font-size:88%"|2–0
|style="font-size:88%"|November 22, 2014
|style="font-size:88%"|2014 Global Wrestling Championships I
|style="text-align:left;font-size:88%;" |
 Ithaca, New York
|-
! style=background:white colspan=7 | 
|-
|Win
|21–8
|align=left| Luis Quintana
|style="font-size:88%"|4–0
|style="font-size:88%" rowspan=3|February 11–15, 2014
|style="font-size:88%" rowspan=3|2014 Granma & Cerro Pelado International
|style="text-align:left;font-size:88%;" rowspan=3|
 Havana, Cuba
|-
|Win
|20–8
|align=left| Cleopas Ncube
|style="font-size:88%"|TF 10–0
|-
|Win
|19–8
|align=left| Ryan Lue
|style="font-size:88%"|TF 12–2
|-
! style=background:white colspan=7 | 
|-
|Loss
|18–8
|align=left| Ashraf Aliyev
|style="font-size:88%"|3–3
|style="font-size:88%" rowspan=4|November 22–24, 2013
|style="font-size:88%" rowspan=4|2013 Heydar Aliyev Golden Grand Prix
|style="text-align:left;font-size:88%;" rowspan=4|
 Baku, Azerbaijan
|-
|Loss
|18–7
|align=left| Gadzhi Gadzhiev
|style="font-size:88%"|1–7
|-
|Win
|18–6
|align=left| Denis Tsargush
|style="font-size:88%"|10–5
|-
|Win
|17–6
|align=left| Ali Shabanau
|style="font-size:88%"|7–1
|-
! style=background:white colspan=7 | 
|-
|Loss
|16–6
|align=left| Jordan Burroughs
|style="font-size:88%"|OT 6–9
|style="font-size:88%" rowspan=5|June 20–22, 2013
|style="font-size:88%" rowspan=2|2013 US World Team Trials
|style="text-align:left;font-size:88%;" rowspan=5|
 Stillwater, Oklahoma
|-
|Loss
|16–5
|align=left| Jordan Burroughs
|style="font-size:88%"|TF 0–7
|-
|Win
|16–4
|align=left| Andrew Howe
|style="font-size:88%"|OT 4–2
|style="font-size:88%" rowspan=3|2013 US World Team Trials Challenge Tournament
|-
|Win
|15–4
|align=left| David Taylor
|style="font-size:88%"|7–4
|-
|Win
|14–4
|align=left| Trent Paulson
|style="font-size:88%"|TF 8–1
|-
|Win
|13–4
|align=left| Hassan Tahmasebi
|style="font-size:88%"|2–0, 1–0
|style="font-size:88%"|May 15, 2013
|style="font-size:88%"|2013 Beat The Streets: Rumble on the Rails
|style="text-align:left;font-size:88%;" |
 New York City, New York
|-
! style=background:white colspan=7 | 
|-
|Win
|12–4
|align=left| Nick Marable
|style="font-size:88%"|3–0, 1–1
|style="font-size:88%" rowspan=5|April 21–22, 2012
|style="font-size:88%" rowspan=5|2012 US Olympic Team Trials
|style="text-align:left;font-size:88%;" rowspan=5|
 Iowa City, Iowa
|-
|Win
|11–4
|align=left| David Taylor
|style="font-size:88%"|Fall
|-
|Loss
|10–4
|align=left| Trent Paulson
|style="font-size:88%"|0–2, 1–0, 0–6
|-
|Win
|10–3
|align=left| Nick Marable
|style="font-size:88%"|0–1, 1–0, 1–0
|-
|Win
|9–3
|align=left| Colt Sponseller
|style="font-size:88%"|2–0, 1–0
|-
! style=background:white colspan=7 | 
|-
|Loss
|8–3
|align=left| Kirk White
|style="font-size:88%"|3–0, 0–1, 0–1
|style="font-size:88%" rowspan=5|June 9–11, 2011
|style="font-size:88%" rowspan=5|2011 US World Team Trials Challenge
|style="text-align:left;font-size:88%;" rowspan=5|
 Oklahoma City, Oklahoma
|-
|Win
|8–2
|align=left| Tyler Caldwell
|style="font-size:88%"|3–0, 2–4, 4–3
|-
|Win
|7–2
|align=left| Moza Fay
|style="font-size:88%"|2–0, 5–0
|-
|Loss
|6–2
|align=left| Nick Marable
|style="font-size:88%"|3–3, 0–3, 0–1
|-
|Win
|6–1
|align=left| J.P. O`Connor
|style="font-size:88%"|0–1, 2–1, 1–0
|-
! style=background:white colspan=7 | 
|-
|Loss
|5–1
|align=left| Andrew Howe
|style="font-size:88%"|1–3, 2–1, 0–1
|style="font-size:88%" rowspan=6|April 20–23, 2011
|style="font-size:88%" rowspan=6|2011 US University National Championships
|style="text-align:left;font-size:88%;" rowspan=6|
 Akron, Ohio
|-
|Win
|5–0
|align=left| Nick Sulzer
|style="font-size:88%"|3–1, 3–1
|-
|Win
|4–0
|align=left| Dirk Cowburn
|style="font-size:88%"|2–0, 1–0
|-
|Win
|3–0
|align=left| Corey Lear
|style="font-size:88%"|7–0, 3–1
|-
|Win
|2–0
|align=left| Taylor Smith
|style="font-size:88%"|TF 7–0, 6–0
|-
|Win
|1–0
|align=left| Brandon Guthrie
|style="font-size:88%"|TF 5–0, 7–0
|-

NCAA record 

! colspan="8"| NCAA Championships Matches
|-
!  Res.
!  Record
!  Opponent
!  Score
!  Date
!  Event
|-
! style=background:white colspan=6 |2013 NCAA Championships  at 165 lbs
|-
|Win
|20–0
|align=left|David Taylor
|style="font-size:88%"|5–4
|style="font-size:88%" rowspan=5|March 21–23, 2013
|style="font-size:88%" rowspan=5|2013 NCAA Division I National Championships
|-
|Win
|19–0
|align=left|Tyler Caldwell
|style="font-size:88%"|2–0
|-
|Win
|18–0
|align=left|Nick Sulzer
|style="font-size:88%"|MD 13–0
|-
|Win
|17–0
|align=left|Ryan Leblanc
|style="font-size:88%"|MD 10–0
|-
|Win
|16–0
|align=left|Mark Martin
|style="font-size:88%"|3–0
|-
! style=background:white colspan=6 |2012 NCAA Championships  at 157 lbs
|-
|Win
|15–0
|align=left|Derek St. John
|style="font-size:88%"|4–1
|style="font-size:88%" rowspan=5|March 15–17, 2012
|style="font-size:88%" rowspan=5|2012 NCAA Division I National Championships
|-
|Win
|14–0
|align=left|Ganbayar Sanjaa
|style="font-size:88%"|4–0
|-
|Win
|13–0
|align=left|Frank Hickman
|style="font-size:88%"|Fall
|-
|Win
|12–0
|align=left|Josh Kreimier
|style="font-size:88%"|Fall
|-
|Win
|11–0
|align=left|John Nicholson
|style="font-size:88%"|Fall
|-
! style=background:white colspan=6 |2011 NCAA Championships  at 149 lbs
|-
|Win
|10–0
|align=left|Frank Molinaro
|style="font-size:88%"|8–1
|style="font-size:88%" rowspan=5|March 17–19, 2011
|style="font-size:88%" rowspan=5|2011 NCAA Division I National Championships
|-
|Win
|9–0
|align=left|Ganbayar Sanjaa
|style="font-size:88%"|4–0
|-
|Win
|8–0
|align=left|Jamal Parks
|style="font-size:88%"|3–0
|-
|Win
|7–0
|align=left|Torsten Gillespie
|style="font-size:88%"|MD 8–0
|-
|Win
|6–0
|align=left|Donnie Corby
|style="font-size:88%"|4–0
|-
! style=background:white colspan=6 |2010 NCAA Championships  at 141 lbs
|-
|Win
|5–0
|align=left|Montell Marion
|style="font-size:88%"|7–3
|style="font-size:88%" rowspan=5|March 18–20, 2010
|style="font-size:88%" rowspan=5|2010 NCAA Division I National Championships
|-
|Win
|4–0
|align=left|Reece Humphrey
|style="font-size:88%"|TB 3–2
|-
|Win
|3–0
|align=left|Levi Jones
|style="font-size:88%"|MD 11–0
|-
|Win
|2–0
|align=left|Elijah Nacita
|style="font-size:88%"|Fall
|-
|Win
|1–0
|align=left|Todd Schavrien
|style="font-size:88%"|4–1
|-

References

External links 
 
 
 
 Kyle Dake's Rokfin Channel

1991 births
Living people
American wrestlers
Cornell Big Red wrestlers
Sportspeople from Ithaca, New York
World Wrestling Championships medalists
Pan American Wrestling Championships medalists
Wrestlers at the 2020 Summer Olympics
Medalists at the 2020 Summer Olympics
Olympic bronze medalists for the United States in wrestling